A Local Book For Local People is a book by the British comedy team behind The League of Gentlemen. It is similar to comedy books by Monty Python and The Goodies in that it is a collection of loose material collected in a scrap book format. The material is connected by Tubbs, who has found the various snippets on the moors.

The Local Book is notable in that the material is much more risqué than the television series.

2000 non-fiction books
Comedy books
The League of Gentlemen